Fergburger is a hamburger restaurant located in Queenstown, New Zealand, which specialises in gourmet hamburgers. Their burgers include those prepared with lamb, cod, falafel, a swine-and-chicken mix and venison.

History 
Fergburger started in February 2001, operating out of a garage off Cow Lane, its obscure location making it hard to find but conversely giving it something of a novelty status, relying on word of mouth to attract customers. It is now located on Shotover Street next to the new addition of Ferg Baker.

Ferg Baker 
Ferg Baker is a new premises which was an expansion of Fergburger and opened for business in 2011. It is a bakery that sells pies, pastries, sandwiches, breads and cakes.

See also

List of restaurants in New Zealand
List of fast food restaurants in New Zealand
List of hamburger restaurants

References

External links
 

Hamburger restaurants
Fast-food hamburger restaurants
Restaurants in New Zealand
Queenstown, New Zealand